Some Things is the debut album by Belgian trio Lasgo, originally released in Belgium on 19 November 2001 with Antler-Subway record label. The album was also released across the world throughout 2001 and 2002.

At the time of album release, the trio consisted of lead vocalist Evi Goffin (left group in 2008), and record producers Peter Luts and David Vervoort (aka Dave McCullen; former group member).

The debut single, "Something", was released in June 2001, and was proceeded by two more singles from the album, "Alone" and "Pray".

Track listing

Charts

References

External links 

2002 debut albums
Lasgo albums
European Border Breakers Award-winning albums